Fábio Gomes may refer to:
Fábio Gomes (footballer, born 1981), Brazilian footballer
Fábio Gomes (footballer, born 1988), Portuguese footballer
Fábio Gomes (pole vaulter) (born 1983), Brazilian pole vaulter
Fábio Gomes (footballer, born 1997), Brazilian footballer